The 2020–21 Murray State Racers men's basketball team represented Murray State University during the 2020–21 NCAA Division I men's basketball season. The Racers, led by sixth-year head coach Matt McMahon, played their home games at the CFSB Center in Murray, Kentucky as members of the Ohio Valley Conference.

Previous season
The Racers finished the 2019–20 season 23–9, 15–3 in OVC play to finish in a tie for the OVC regular season championship. They defeated Austin Peay in the semifinals of the OVC tournament to advance to the championship game where they lost to Belmont. With 23 wins, they were a candidate for a postseason bid. However, all postseason tournaments were cancelled amid the COVID-19 pandemic.

Roster

Schedule and results

|-
!colspan=9 style=| Exhibition

|-
!colspan=9 style=| Regular season

|-
!colspan=12 style=| Ohio Valley Conference tournament
|-

|-

References

Murray State Racers men's basketball seasons
Murray State
Murray State
Murray State